John W. Taylor may refer to:
John W. Taylor (Mormon) (1858–1916), apostle of The Church of Jesus Christ of Latter-day Saints
John W. Taylor (politician) (1784–1854), early nineteenth-century American politician
John Wilkinson Taylor (educator) (1906–2001), acting head of UNESCO, 1952–1953
John Wilkinson Taylor (politician) (1855–1934), early British Labour politician
John W. Taylor (professor) (born 1950), American mycologist researching fungal evolution

See also
John Taylor (disambiguation)